The International Journal of Cooperative Information Systems was founded in 1992 and is published by World Scientific. It "addresses the intricacies of cooperative work in the framework of distributed interoperable information systems" from principles, frameworks, and methodology, to actual application in business process management systems.

Abstracting and indexing 
The journal is abstracted and indexed in Current Contents/Engineering, Computing & Technology, CompuMath Citation Index, and Inspec.

References

External links 
 

World Scientific academic journals
Publications established in 1992
English-language journals
Computer science journals